U.S. Route 33 (US 33) in the U.S. state of West Virginia extends  from the Ohio River at Ravenswood to the Virginia state line atop Shenandoah Mountain west of Harrisonburg, Virginia.

Route description

Shortly after entering West Virginia and crossing the Ohio River, US 33 turns south, then east in Ravenswood. It then joins SR 2's freeway, turning northeast, then east again to Silverton. The two routes then split, and US 33 joins Interstate 77 to Ripley. The route then turns east from I-77, joining US 119 at Spencer, then passing through extremely rural areas of Roane, Calhoun, Gilmer, and Lewis counties.

US 33 Intersects Interstate 79 at Weston, West Virginia. From Interstate 79 east, US 33 is a four-lane highway, part of Corridor H of the Appalachian Development Highway System.  The four-lane segment continues on through rural areas of Upshur, and Randolph counties, to just a couple miles past Elkins.

At Harding, US 250 joins US 33 for several miles after Elkins, where US 33 joins SR 55 and returns to a two-lane road, except for a seven-mile (11 km) section of four-lane across Kelly Mountain between Canfield and Bowden.  Passing through the Monongahela National Forest, US 33 crosses the Eastern Continental Divide between Harman and Onego at about  elevation, entering Pendleton County, then descends the Allegheny Front along Seneca Creek, skirting the north end of Spruce Mountain, at  the highest point of the Allegheny Mountains.

US 33 then joins SR 28 at Seneca Rocks, West Virginia, and continues south in the Potomac River headwaters through scenic forest and farmland landscapes. US 220 joins US 33 for about half a mile in Franklin. After Franklin, US 33 continues eastward through rural areas, then climbs steeply to cross Shenandoah Mountain at Dry River Gap at about  into Rockingham County, Virginia.

Major intersections

References

33
 West Virginia
U. S. Route 033
U. S. Route 033
U. S. Route 033
U. S. Route 033
U. S. Route 033
U. S. Route 033
U. S. Route 033
U. S. Route 033